Taschensee is a lake in Scharbeutz, Schleswig-Holstein, Germany. At an elevation of 22,18 m, its surface area is 0.4 km².

Lakes of Schleswig-Holstein
LTaschensee